David Breed Beard (1 February 1922, Needham, Massachusetts – 21 January 1998, Portland, Maine) was a space physicist, known for "pioneering work on the shapes and structures of planetary magnetospheres, Jovian radio emissions, and comets."

After serving in the U.S. Navy during WWII, Beard graduated with a bachelor's degree from Hamilton College. He spent a year as a graduate student at Caltech, but then worked at the Naval Research Laboratory in Washington DC. He became a graduate student in physics at Cornell University and graduated there in 1951 with a PhD under the supervision of Hans Bethe. Beard was from 1951 to 1953 a member of the faculty of the University of Connecticut, with a sabbatical year at Oak Ridge National Laboratory, and from 1953 to 1956 an assistant professor at University of California, Davis. He worked from 1954 to 1957 at the University of California Radiation Laboratory at Livermore and from 1956 to 1958 at Lockheed Aircraft Corporation. He was a professor from 1959 to 1964 at the University of California, Davis and from 1964 to 1987 at the University of Kansas, where he retired as professor emeritus.

His 1964 paper "Shape of the Geomagnetic Field Solar Wind Boundary", written with Gilbert Mead, has been cited over 300 times.

From 1965 to 1966 Beard was both a Fulbright Senior Research Scholar and a Guggenheim Fellow at Imperial College, London. There he was again a visiting scientist in 1972 as a NATO Senior Fellow. He was the author or coauthor of two books and about 80 scientific publications.

Selected publications
 1957
 1959
 1959
 1960
 1960
 1961
 1962
 1964
 1964
 1966
 1972
 1973
 1974
 1977
 1979
 1980
 1982
 1984

References

1922 births
1998 deaths
American astrophysicists
Hamilton College (New York) alumni
Cornell University alumni
University of California, Davis faculty
University of Kansas faculty
United States Navy personnel of World War II